Yackson Stiven Rivas (born 18 March 2002) is a Venezuelan footballer who plays as a forward for Mineros de Guayana.

Career statistics

Club

Notes

References

2002 births
Living people
Venezuelan footballers
Association football forwards
A.C.C.D. Mineros de Guayana players